These are the official results of the Women's Individual Pursuit at the 1992 Summer Olympics in Barcelona, Spain. The races were held on July 30, and July 31, 1992 at the Velòdrom d'Hortawith a race distance of 3 km.  This was the Olympic debut of this event for the women.

Medalists

Results
Q Denotes qualified for next round.
q Denotes qualified for classification round.
OVTK Denotes overtaken by opponent during heat.
CAP Denotes captured your opponent.
DNS Denotes did not start.
WR Denotes New world record.
OR Denotes New Olympic record

Qualifying round
Held, July 30

The seventeen riders raced against each other in matches of two.  Qualification for the next round was not based on who won those matches, however.  The cyclists with the eight fastest times advanced to the quarter-finals,  regardless of whether they won or lost their match.

Quarter-finals
Held July 30
In the first round of actual match competition, cyclists were seeded into matches based on their times from the qualifying round.  The winners of the four heats of advanced to the semi-finals.

Heat 1

Heat 2

Heat 3

Heat 4

Semi-finals
Held July 31
The winner of the two heats advance to the finals, for the gold medal.  The loser with the fastest semi-final time wins the bronze.

Heat 1

Heat 2

Final
Held July 31

Final classification

References

External links
Official Olympic Report

W
Cycling at the Summer Olympics – Women's individual pursuit
Track cycling at the 1992 Summer Olympics
Olymp
Cyc